Handball competition at the 2004 Summer Olympics for women took place in the Sports Pavilion at the Faliro Coastal Zone Olympic Complex for the preliminary competition.  From the quarter final stage onwards the women's event moved to the Helliniko Olympic Indoor Arena.

The women's event involved ten teams split in two groups:
Group A: Brazil, China, Greece, Hungary, and Ukraine
Group B: Angola, Denmark, France, South Korea, and Spain

Medalists

Qualification

Group stage
All times are local (UTC+3).

Group A

Group B

Knockout stage

Bracket

Quarterfinals

5–8th place semifinals

Semifinals

Ninth place game

Seventh place game

Fifth place game

Bronze medal game

Gold medal game

Ranking and statistics

Final ranking

All-Star Team
Goalkeeper: 
Left wing: 
Left back: 
Pivot: 
Centre back: 
Right back: 
Right wing: 
Source: IHF

Top goalscorers

Top goalkeepers

References 

 

Women's handball
Women's handball in Greece
2004 in women's handball
2004 in Greek women's sport
Women's events at the 2004 Summer Olympics